Biswa Bangla is an MSME enterprise established by the Government of West Bengal to promote handicrafts and textile of the Indian state of West Bengal.

History
The erstwhile Manjusha under the West Bengal Handicrafts Development Corporation was a loss bearing enterprise.
Manjusha posted its first operational profit of Rs 3.15 crore since 1976, while Tantuja (under the West Bengal State Handloom Weavers Cooperative Society), set up in 1945, made record operational profits in 2015–16 at Rs 3.5 crore.
Till 2013, the two entities – established with the purpose of promoting and marketing the craftsmanship of Bengal – were heavily subsidised by the state government.
After coming to power in 2011, Mamata Banerjee initiated the development of a micro, small and medium enterprises. In 2013, Biswa Bangla came into existence to promote the state's dying arts and crafts. The first store to sell products under the brand came up in 2014 in Kolkata.

Products

Biswa Bangla has more than 5,000 products, including a collection of 24 kinds of dolls from various parts of the state. Muslin products sold at Biswa Bangla stores include handkerchiefs, dhotis, boxer pants, dyeing rolls, bed sheets and clothes for men and women.
Products being revived is the Carmichael Rumal, a handkerchief made of Murshidabad silk.
The arts being revived at Biswa Bangla are Indo-Portuguese shawls – each of which takes about six months to embroider – muslin, Darjeeling tea, masks, attar perfumes, Kalimpong cheese, mustard sauce and honey from the Sunderbans.

Showrooms

There are seven Biswa Bangla showrooms, most of them concentrated in West Bengal, one in Darjeeling and Bagdogra and one located in New Delhi.

Further expansion
There are plans to take the presence of the stores beyond India to countries such as England, United States and China.

References

Companies based in Kolkata
2014 establishments in West Bengal
Indian companies established in 2014
Retail companies established in 2014
Government agencies established in 2014